Didier Quillot (born 18 May 1959) is a French businessman, and a former Chief Executive of Orange France (subsidiary of France Télécom), and since 2016 the Chief Executive of France's Ligue de Football Professionnel.

Early life
He was born in Mas-Grenier, Tarn-et-Garonne, in the Occitanie region of France. He gained a diploma in Electronic Engineering from Institut national des sciences appliquées de Toulouse (INSA Toulouse), part of Toulouse Tech. He gained a further degree from the Institut d'administration des entreprises de Paris.

Career

France Télécom
He joined France Télécom in 1994. From 2001 to 2006 he was the Chief Executive of Orange France, the mobile phone network of France Télécom.

Ligue de Football Professionnel
He became Chief Executive of the Ligue de Football Professionnel in March 2016.

See also
 Stéphane Richard, current chief executive what became of France Télécom

References

External links
 LFP

1959 births
Living people
Chevaliers of the Légion d'honneur
Knights of the Ordre national du Mérite
Football people in France
French chief executives
Orange S.A.
People from Tarn-et-Garonne
20th-century French businesspeople
21st-century French businesspeople